Flamurtari Sports Palace is an indoor sporting arena located in Vlorë, Albania. Built in 1979, it is located next to Flamurtari Stadium and houses the offices of Flamurtari Sports Club. The arena has a capacity of 2,040 and hosts a range of indoor sports including basketball, volleyball, futsal and boxing.

References

Indoor arenas in Albania
Buildings and structures in Vlorë County
Buildings and structures in Vlorë
Basketball venues in Albania
Volleyball venues in Albania
Sports venues in Albania
Indoor track and field venues